Gayón is an extinct language of western Venezuela, spoken at the sources of the Tocuyo River in the state of Lara. Other than being part of the Jirajaran family, its classification is uncertain due to a lack of data. Coyón is sometimes given as an alternative name (LinguistList), but may simply be an undocumented neighboring language (Loukotka 1968).

References

Languages of Venezuela
Extinct languages of South America
Jirajaran languages